The Stadium Badminton Kuala Lumpur was a now-demolished badminton arena located in Cheras, Kuala Lumpur, Malaysia.

History
Built in 1990, the stadium can hold 4,500 spectators. The stadium was used as the headquarters of Badminton Asia Confederation and was also the base of Badminton World Federation from 2005 to 2006 until BWF decided move to Putra Indoor Stadium, Bukit Jalil.

Located right next to Jalan Cheras, it was demolished in 2018 to make way for a luxury condominium.

References

Badminton venues in Malaysia
Demolished buildings and structures in Malaysia
Volleyball venues in Malaysia
Sports venues in Kuala Lumpur
Indoor arenas in Malaysia
Sports venues completed in 1990